Chen Jenn-yeu (born 1955) is the dean of the College of International Studies and Social Sciences and the director of the Graduate Institute and the Department of Chinese as a Second Language at National Taiwan Normal University.

Chen received his Ph.D. degree in experimental/cognitive psychology in 1987 from the State University of New York at Stony Brook (now known as Stony Brook University). He has a broad interest in the theoretical and applied issues related to attention and language processing. His fields of interest include cognitive psychology, psycholinguistics, neuropsychology, psychometrics and biostatistics.

Most of his research can be summarized under the conceptual framework of artifact-augmented cognition. Under this framework, cognition is not an isolated phenomenon, but almost always operates in the context of a human created artifactual environment. How cognition and artifacts interact and mutually influence each other is an issue that lies at the center of this research orientation. On the theoretical side, the focus of research is more on cognitive diversity than on cognitive universal, i.e., how cognition varies across cultures, languages, and artifacts (e.g., paper and pencil vs. computer and keyboard). On the applied side, Chen focuses on studying how the design of artifacts can better fit the human cognitive system and ensure a net gain of sufficient benefits.

Education
Ph.D., the Department of Psychology, the State University of New York at Stony Brook.
M.S., the Department of Biostatistics, Columbia University.
M.A., the Department of Linguistics, the State University of New York at Stony Brook.
B.A., the Department of English, National Taiwan Normal University.

Positions
Dean, the College of International Studies and Social Sciences, National Taiwan Normal University. August 2014 – Present
Chairman, the Department of Chinese as a Second Language, National Taiwan Normal University. August 2014 – Present
Chairman, the Department of Chinese as a Second Language, National Taiwan Normal University. August 2013-July 2014
Full-Time Professor, the Department of Chinese as a Second Language, National Taiwan Normal University. September 2011-July 2013
Full-Time Professor, the Institute of Cognitive Science and the Department of Psychology, National Cheng Kung University. August 2008-August 2011
Chairman, the  Institute of Cognitive Science, National Cheng Kung University. June 2008-July 2008
Dean, the College of Social Science, National Cheng Kung University. August 2003-July 2006
Director, the Institute of Education, National Cheng Kung University. August 2003-July 2006
Chairman, the Department of Psychology, National Chung Cheng University. August 2000-July 2003
Full-Time Professor, the Department of Psychology, National Chung Cheng University. August 1998-July 2000
Associate Professor, the Department of Psychology, National Chung Cheng University. August 1992-July 1998
Researcher, Medical Center of Mental Health and Psychiatry, The Child and Adolescent Psychiatry Clinic, the State University of New York. June 1990-May 1992.
Postdoctoral Researcher, the Department of Neurology, Columbia University. January 1988-May 1988.
Part-Time Assistant Professor, the Department of Psychology, Barnard College, Columbia University. January 1988-May 1988.
Lecturer, the Department of Psychology, the State University of New York at Stony Brook. September 1984-December 1987
Teaching Assistant, the Department of Psychology, the State University of New York at Stony Brook. September 1982-August 1984

References

1955 births
Living people
Taiwanese psychologists
Stony Brook University alumni
Academic staff of the National Taiwan Normal University
Columbia University alumni
National Taiwan Normal University alumni
Academic staff of the National Chung Cheng University
Academic staff of the National Cheng Kung University
Taiwanese university and college faculty deans